Margaret Court and Judy Dalton were the defending champions but Margaret Court did not compete this year. 

Judy Dalton teamed up with Rosemary Casals and successfully defended her title by defeating Gail Chanfreau and Françoise Dürr 6–3, 6–3 in the final.

Seeds

Draw

Finals

Top half

Bottom half

References

External links
1971 US Open – Women's draws and results at the International Tennis Federation

Women's Doubles
US Open (tennis) by year – Women's doubles
1971 in women's tennis
1971 in American women's sports